Ondangwa railway station is a railway station serving the town of Ondangwa in Namibia. It is part of the TransNamib Railway.

History

Trains

Station layout

Nearest Airport
The nearest airports are Ondangwa Airport at Ondangwa, Otjiwarongo Airport at Otjiwarongo.

List of airports in Namibia

See also

References

External links

Buildings and structures in Oshana Region
Railway stations in Namibia
TransNamib Railway